Raman Chahar (born 3 December 1988) is an Indian first-class cricketer who represented Rajasthan. He made his first-class debut for Rajasthan in the 2010-11 Ranji Trophy on 10 November 2010.

References

External links
 

1988 births
Living people
Indian cricketers
Rajasthan cricketers